Tom or Tom the greatest friend was a 2003 Spanish children's television animated series produced by the European Broadcasting Union (EBU), Cromosoma and Norma Editorial which was subsequently broadcast in several European countries.

The show followed the adventures of the titular character, "Tom", who was the last remaining dinosaur, as he traveled around the world with the circus ran by his friends. The series followed their travels to different countries and landmarks including the Eiffel Tower, the canals of Venice, the Himalayas, and the Andes, whilst also following the attempts of two bungling criminals; Weedon and Hatch, to kidnap Tom for their boss, the equally cunning and greedy Mr Carter.

The show was unique in that it used a blend of both 2D and 3D animation. The show primarily employed 2D animation for the characters and scenes, however 3D models were utilised for chase sequences and occasional landscape shots.

References

2003 Spanish television series debuts
Animated television series about dinosaurs
Spanish children's animated television series